Pocono may refer to:

Places 
 Pocono Mountains, a mountainous region in northeastern Pennsylvania
 Pocono Creek, a tributary of Brodhead Creek in the Poconos
 Pocono Biological Laboratories, a company related to Sanofi pasteur
 Pocono Raceway, a superspeedway in the Poconos
 The Pocono 400, a NASCAR race held at Pocono Raceway
 Pocono Ridge, a neighborhood in Brookfield, Connecticut
 Pocono Mountain Formation, geologic formation in Virginia

Other uses 
 USS Pocono (AGC-16), a United States Navy amphibious force command ship in commission from 1945 to 1971
 Piper PA-35 Pocono, a twin-engined pressurized commuter airliner produced by Piper Aircraft. Only one built 
 Pocono Airlines, regional airline

See also